Hicham Ibrahimi is a Moroccan actor.

Filmography 
 Chevaux de fortune (1995)
 Un simple fait divers (1997)
 Elle est diabétique et hypertendue et elle refuse de crever (1999)
 Ali Zaoua: Prince of the Streets (2000)
 Wahda Men Bazaf (2007)
 Châtiment (2009)

References

External links 
 

Moroccan actors
Year of birth missing (living people)
Living people